The anthem of the Apure State, Venezuela was written by Amadeo Garbi. The music was composed by César Ramírez Gómez. The anthem is titled as ¡Vuelvan Caras! (Turn your faces!), as it was stated by a decree in 1978. Although it was composed in 1910, the regional government adopted it as the official anthem three years later.

Lyrics in Spanish Language
Chorus
¡Vuelvan caras! al grito potente, 
que el poder colonial sucumbió!
y que en las pampas extensas de Apure 
se oye el eco vibrar de esta voz.

I 
Como el águila cruza el espacio
sin que nadie detenga su vuelo,
cruza libre el llanero este suelo 
que su lanza y valor libertó.
y si ayer a la voz de Bolívar, 
respondieron los bravos centauros: 
ceñiremos de nuevo más lauros
si se alzare tirano ante nos.

II 
Son los de orgullo y de gloria 
que ostentamos en nuestras banderas
Mucuritas, Yagual, Las Queseras
y otros campos de fama inmortal.
Y a los noble y heroicos varones 
que de Apure ilustraron la historia 
venerando su augusta memoria, 
batiremos la palma triunfal.

III 
Y hoy unidos con nuestros hermanos 
de Orinoco a la cima del Ande, 
a la paz que sus frutos expanden
sostendrá nuestro altivo valor. 
Y teniendo por norma las leyes 
escuchados en nuestros derechos
latirán de contento los pechos 
a los nombres, patria y honor!

Lyrics in English Language
Chorus
¡Turn around! to the potent shout, 
that the colonial power succumbed!
and that in the vast plains of Apure 
it is heard the vibration of this voice's echo.

I 
As the eagle crosses the space
without anyone stopping its flight,
the plainsman crosses freely this soil 
that his spear and courage liberated.
and if yesterday to Bolivar's voice, 
the brave centaures responded: 
we will wear again more laurels
if a tyrant would rise against us.

II 
They are those of pride and glory 
that we flaunt on our flags
Mucuritas, Yagual, Las Queseras
and other fields of immortal fame.
and to the heroic and noble males 
that from Apure illustrated history 
venerating their august memory, 
we will flap the triumphal palm.

III 
And today in union with our brothers
from the Orinoco to the top of the Ande, 
to the peace that their fruits expand
will sustain our haughty courage. 
and having laws as norms 
heard in our rights
will beat content our chests 
to the names homeland and honor!

See also
 List of anthems of Venezuela

Anthems of Venezuela
Spanish-language songs
1910 songs